Ri Hyok-chol (born 26 November 1973) is a North Korean former footballer. He represented North Korea on at least six occasions between 1999 and 2000, scoring four goals.

Career statistics

International

International goals
Scores and results list North Korea's goal tally first, score column indicates score after each North Korea goal.

References

1973 births
Living people
North Korean footballers
North Korea international footballers
Association footballers not categorized by position